WTBH (91.5 FM) is a radio station broadcasting a Religious music format. Licensed to Chiefland, Florida, United States.  The station is currently owned by Long Pond Baptist Church.

References

External links
 

TBH
Levy County, Florida
Baptist Christianity in Florida
1988 establishments in Florida
Radio stations established in 1988